Borić ( 1154–63) was the first known by name Ban of Bosnia, and progenitor of Boričević royal house. He was appointed Ban of Bosnia in 1154, during Byzantine-Hungarian conflicts, nominally a Hungarian vassal, he was last mentioned in 1163.

Rule
Borić is mentioned by Byzantine Greek historian John Kinnamos in his history book covering years 1118–1176, where he was referred as Hungarian ally, not a vassal as often considered by historiography. The first certain mention regards 1154, when the Byzantine-Hungarian war was underway, with engagements in the Danube area. Hungarian king Géza II surrounded Byzantine-held  (in Serbia) and devastated the surrounding area. Part of this Hungarian force was Hungarian vassal Borić, the ban of Bosnia, and a Bohemian detachment. Kinnamos described Borić as "exarch (governor) of the land/country of Bosnia". When the Hungarian force raised the siege of Braničevo and headed west for Belgrade, Byzantine emperor Manuel I Komnenos sent a detachment to attack the Bosnian troops. However, that Byzantine detachment clashed with the main Hungarian force and was decisively defeated.

It is uncertain how and when Borić came to rule Bosnia. According to Vladimir Ćorović, he was not a native Bosnian; it is believed that his origins should have been trace in Slavonia, in the Grabarje area in župa Požega. As Hungary became the overlord of Bosnia in the 1130s, and it has been claimed in historiography that Borić was appointed governor in Bosnia as a Hungarian vassal, and was obliged to participate in the march on Braničevo. However, currently it is believed that he was an ally of the Hungarians not a vassal.

Later years
There is no mention of Borić until 1163, by which time Géza II was deceased (31 May 1162) and there was a civil war in Hungary regarding the inheritance of the throne – Géza's brothers Ladislaus and Stephen IV rose up against crowned heir Stephen III. Ladislaus managed to gain the throne, but he died shortly afterwards (14 January 1163), upon which Stephen IV took it with Byzantine help. Borić supported Stephen IV, presumably due to assurance that Stephen IV would, as a Byzantine protege, stand. In 1163 at Esztergom, Stephen IV issued a charter in which he confirmed ban Beloš's decision that the Dubrava forest belongs to the Bishopric of Zagreb; among witnesses were Borić, listed after Beloš, a Hungarian court member and palatine, and before other counts. Also, with the permit of Stephen IV, Borić in 1162–63 gifted the village of Zdelje (Esdel) to the Templars in Slavonia, later confirmed by kings Béla III and Andrew II (in 1209), as part of further gifts of his descendants.

In 1163, the intended heir Stephen III defeated Stephen IV and eventually plead to Byzantium. The new king then chased after Stephen IV's supporters–and his enemies–including ban Borić. Gesta Hunnorum et Hungarorum (ca. 1282–85) says that a "miles (soldier) Gotfridus" went after the lord of Bosnia, whom he defeated, on the order of the Hungarian king. After this, mentions of Borić in Bosnia disappear. From ca. 1166, Bosnia was a Byzantine province.

Legacy
Borić's descendants are sometimes referred to as the Boričević. He had sons, Borić and Pavao, and his grandsons were called Odola, Čelk and Borić. The extended family also included Detmar and Benedikt (also called Borić). In the 13th century his descendants had possessions on both sides of the river Sava, in the eastern and western parts of what is now the Požega County.

An undated charter of Borić to the Benedictine monastery on Lokrum was proven to be a forgery from the 13th century.

See also
 Banate of Bosnia

Annotations

References

Sources and further reading
Books
 

 
 

Journals

Bans of Bosnia
12th-century rulers in Europe
12th-century Hungarian people
12th-century Bosnian people
Borićević dynasty
Bosnian monarchs
People of the Banate of Bosnia